John Browne (1453–) was an English composer of the Tudor period. Despite the high level of skill displayed in Browne's compositions, few of his works survive; Browne's extant music is found in the Eton Choirbook, in which he is the best-represented contributor, and the Fayrfax Manuscript. His choral music is distinguished by innovative scoring, false relations, and unusually long melodic lines, and has been called by early music scholar Peter Phillips "subtle, almost mystical" and "extreme in ways which apparently have no parallel, either in England or abroad."

Life

Little is known of Browne's life. A John Browne from Coventry, believed to be the composer, was elected scholar of Eton in July 1467; he is described as having been 14 years of age at the time of his appointment, making him a slightly younger contemporary of Walter Lambe, who was likely at Eton during Browne's tenure. Nothing is known of his later career or death.

Music
All of Browne's surviving works are found in the earlier folios of the Eton Choirbook, dating from between 1490 and 1500. According to the index of the Choirbook, ten more Browne compositions were originally included; five of these compositions have been lost, while two survive in fragmentary form.

Browne's music is notable for its varied and unusual vocal instrumentation; each of his surviving works calls for a unique array of voices, with no two compositions sharing a given ensemble scoring. A prime example of Browne's penchant for unorthodox groupings is his six-voice antiphon Stabat iuxta, scored for a choir of four tenors and two basses. His choral music often displays careful treatment of the dramatic possibilities of the text and expressive use of imitation and dissonance; the aforementioned Stabat iuxta, in particular, has been noted for its "dense, almost cluster chords" and "harsh" false relations. Other works have a wide range, with lower voices against soaring soprano lines. Though comparatively few in number compared with his continental contemporaries, Browne's works are expressively intense and often lengthy, several lasting a quarter of an hour or so to perform. Many of the composers in the Eton Choirbook are represented only in this manuscript, due to the dissolution of the monasteries and widespread destruction of untold numbers of Catholic music manuscripts in Henry VIII's reign. We may never know the actual output of Browne and his English contemporaries and subsequent English composers of the early 16th century.

Works

 O Maria salvatoris mater
 Stabat mater dolorosa
 Stabat virgo mater Christi
 Stabat juxta Christi crucem
 O regina mundi clara
 Salve regina mater misericordiae
 Salve regina mater misericordiae
 Ave lux totius mundi (lost)
 Gaude flore virginali (lost)
 O mater venerabilis
 Stabat virgo mater Christi
 Magnificat: Et exultavit spiritus meus (lost)
 Magnificat: Et exultavit spiritus meus
 Magnificat: Et exultavit spiritus meus (lost)
 Magnificat: Et exultavit spiritus meus (lost)
 Jesu, Mercy, How May This Be?

References

External links

Renaissance composers
Composers of the Tudor period
English classical composers
15th-century English people
Year of death unknown
English male classical composers
People educated at Eton College
1453 births